Martin Santos (born 20 August 1962) is a former cyclist from Guam. He competed in three events at the 1992 Summer Olympics.

References

External links
 

1962 births
Living people
Guamanian male cyclists
Olympic cyclists of Guam
Cyclists at the 1992 Summer Olympics
American track cyclists
Place of birth missing (living people)